Citywest Campus is a stop on the Luas light-rail tram system in Dublin, Ireland.  It opened in 2011 as a stop on the extension of the Red Line to Saggart.  The stop is located on a section of reserved track next to The Walk in the Citywest development in south-west Dublin which includes a hotel, golf course, shopping centre, and housing.

Citywest was still in development when the Luas line was being planned, so the streets were planned around the tram tracks.  To the west of the stop, trams travel past the village green on their way to Saggart

The stop is served by Dublin Bus routes 65B and 77A.  In addition, Citywest Campus operates its own bus route which acts as a feeder service to the Luas, and takes passengers to other areas of the campus.

References

Luas Red Line stops in South Dublin (county)